Titan Sud (formerly known as Gara 23 August) is a small train station located in the Eastern side of Bucharest, Romania, near the Republica metro station and the Republica Factory (formerly 23 August Factory).

The railway station was built in 1985, mainly to serve commuters on the Bucharest–Oltenița line. As of 2006, the station serves only four commuter train lines, all of them linking to Oltenița. The station is owned by Căile Ferate Române.

References
 

Railway stations in Bucharest
1985 establishments in Romania